Maria Malanowicz-Niedzielska (30 November 1899 – 8 October 1943) was a Polish actress. She was active in theatre and film between 1919 and 1939. A counter-intelligence agent for the Home Army during the Second World War, she was shot and killed during a Home Army action in October 1943.

Select filmography
Geniusz sceny (1939)

References

External links

1899 births
1943 deaths
Actresses from Vilnius
Polish stage actresses
Polish film actresses
20th-century Polish actresses
Polish civilians killed in World War II
Home Army members
Deaths by firearm in Poland